Domenic Weinstein (born 27 August 1994) is a German professional racing cyclist, who most recently rode for UCI Continental team . He rode at the 2015 UCI Track Cycling World Championships.

Major results

2011
 1st  Points race, UCI Junior Track World Championships
 1st  Madison, National Junior Track Championships (with Arne Egner)
2012
 UEC European Junior Track Championships
3rd  Team pursuit (with Leon Rohde, Nils Schomber and Jonas Tenbrock)
3rd  Madison (with Pascal Ackermann)
2013
 2nd  Team sprint, National Track Championships
2014
 UEC European Under-23 Track Championships
1st  Madison (with Leon Rohde)
3rd  Team pursuit (with Marco Mathis, Leon Rohde and Sebastian Wotschke)
 2nd  Individual pursuit, National Track Championships
 3rd Time trial, National Under-23 Road Championships
2015
 National Track Championships
1st  Individual pursuit
1st  Team pursuit (with Henning Bommel, Theo Reinhardt and Nils Schomber)
3rd  Omnium
 1st  Team time trial, National Road Championships
 1st Individual pursuit, UCI World Cup, Cali
 2nd  Individual pursuit, UEC European Track Championships
 4th Time trial, National Under-23 Road Championships
 6th Overall Dookoła Mazowsza
2016
 1st  Team time trial, National Road Championships
 2nd  Individual pursuit, UCI Track World Championships
2017
 National Track Championships
1st  Individual pursuit
1st  Team pursuit (with Lucas Liss, Theo Reinhardt and Kersten Thiele)
 2nd Team pursuit, UCI World Cup, Pruszków
 3rd  Individual pursuit, UEC European Track Championships
2018
 1st  Team pursuit, UEC European Track Championships
 1st  Individual pursuit, National Track Championships
2019
 1st Team pursuit, UCI World Cup, Hong Kong
 2nd  Individual pursuit, UCI Track World Championships
 2nd  Individual pursuit, UEC European Track Championships
2021
 UCI Track Nations Cup, Hong Kong
1st Team pursuit
2nd Individual pursuit
2022
 3rd Team pursuit, UCI Track Nations Cup, Milton

References

External links
 
 
 
 
 

1994 births
Living people
German male cyclists
People from Villingen-Schwenningen
Sportspeople from Freiburg (region)
Olympic cyclists of Germany
Cyclists at the 2016 Summer Olympics
Cyclists at the 2020 Summer Olympics
German track cyclists
European Championships (multi-sport event) gold medalists
Cyclists from Baden-Württemberg
21st-century German people